A1 Team New Zealand is the New Zealand team of A1 Grand Prix, an international racing series.

Management 

The team was formed by and is owned by prominent Auckland businessman Colin Giltrap, well known for this car dealerships. The team is managed by Kiwi Bob McMurray who retired last year after nearly 30 years involvement with the McLaren Formula One racing team. The car is run by David Sears' organisation, Super Nova Racing, as is the A1 Team Germany car, meaning that the two teams are often thought of as one. Prior to Super Nova's involvement, the car was run by West Surrey Racing, a British organisation run by New Zealander Dick Bennetts which fields the Team RAC cars in the British Touring Car Championship.

History

2008–09 season 

Drivers: Earl Bamber, Chris van der Drift

Team New Zealand shocked the A1 paddock by revealing 18-year-old Earl Bamber as their main driver for the race in Zandvoort, even after the success of Jonny Reid in previous seasons. Bamber went on to record two podium finishes at a rain-soaked Zandvoort. However, his replacement Chris van der Drift had less success in Chengdu, China, only scoring two points in the Sprint Race and just missed out on points in the Feature Race.

2007–08 season 

Driver: Jonny Reid

Again, Team New Zealand challenged for the championship, but lost out at Great Britain to Switzerland. The team recorded 4 victories and 2 podiums.

2006–07 season 

Drivers: Matt Halliday, Jonny Reid

Team New Zealand were championship challengers this season, but even with 3 victories and 8 podiums, lost out by 35 points to Germany.

2005–06 season 

Drivers: Matt Halliday, Jonny Reid

In the inaugural season, Team New Zealand scored consistently, as well as a podium, to finish 4th in the championship.

Drivers

Complete A1 Grand Prix results 

(key), "spr" indicate a Sprint Race, "fea" indicate a Main Race.

External links

A1gp.com Official A1 Grand Prix Web Site
West Surrey Racing Web Site
Official Team Website - A1 Team New Zealand

New Zealand A1 team
New Zealand auto racing teams
A
Auto racing teams established in 2005
Auto racing teams disestablished in 2009